Corycium bicolorum is a species of orchid native to South Africa.

References

Coryciinae